Neopluramycin is an antibiotic that inhibits nucleic acid synthesis. It has been isolated from the cultured broth of a strain of Streptomyces pluricolorescens as orange crystals, and analytical data and molecular weight determination are consistent with the empirical formula .

Neopluramycin resembles pluramycin A, but is differentiated by its antibacterial spectrum, toxicity, thin-layer chromatography, and infrared absorption spectrum.

Neopluramycin inhibits growth of Gram-positive bacteria, leukemia L-1210 in mice and Yoshida rat sarcoma cells in tissue culture.

References 

Antibiotics
Oxygen heterocycles
Heterocyclic compounds with 4 rings